Olaf Mihelson (born 2 August 1968) is an Estonian biathlete. He competed in the men's sprint event at the 1994 Winter Olympics.

References

1968 births
Living people
Estonian male biathletes
Olympic biathletes of Estonia
Biathletes at the 1994 Winter Olympics
Sportspeople from Tallinn